Ujed za dušu (trans. Soul Bite) is the eighth studio album by Serbian and former Yugoslav rock band Riblja Čorba, released in 1987.

Background
Except "Član mafije", which criticized League of Communists of Yugoslavia, album is unusually devoid of political messaging for Riblja Čorba. The album hits included Riblja Čorba's first cover, "Zadnji voz za Čačak" (cover of The Monkees' "Last Train to Clarksville"), all-time hit "Kad padne noć (Upomoć)", and ballad "Da, to sam ja".

The songs "Nesrećnice nije te sramota" and "Zašto kuče arlauče" were recorded for the album, but were released only as a limited edition 7-inch included with the first  copies of the album.

Album cover
The album cover was designed by Jugoslav Vlahović.

Track listing

Personnel
Bora Đorđević - vocals
Vidoja Božinović - lead guitar
Nikola Čuturilo - rhythm guitar
Miroslav Milatović - drums
Miša Aleksić - bass guitar

Additional personnel
Kornelije Kovač - keyboards, producer
Jelenko Milanković - percussion
Rade Ercegovac - engineer
Zoran Ivković - engineer

Covers
The song "Kada padne noć (Upomoć)" was sampled by the Serbian hip hop band Sha Ila, in the song of the same title ("Kada padne noć"), released on their 2003 album Multiplay.

References
Notes

Sources
Ujed za dušu at Discogs
 EX YU ROCK enciklopedija 1960-2006,  Janjatović Petar;  
 Riblja čorba,  Jakovljević Mirko;

External links
Ujed za dušu at Discogs

Riblja Čorba albums
1987 albums
PGP-RTB albums